Badia or Badía is the surname of:

 Antoni Maria Badia i Margarit (1920–2014), Spanish/Catalan linguist and philologist
 Carlo Agostino Badia (1672–1738), Italian court composer
 Conchita Badía, stage name of Spanish soprano and pianist Concepció Badia Millàs (1897–1975)
 Domingo Badía y Leblich (1767–1818), Spanish traveller better known as Ali Bey el Abbassi
 Edgar Badia (born 1998), Spanish footballer
 Francesc Badia Batalla (1923–2020), Andorran public servant, judge and historian
 Gerard Badía (born 1989), Spanish footballer
 José Badia (born 1945), Monegasque politician
 Maria Badia i Cutchet (born 1947), Spanish politician
 Miquel Badia (1906–1936), radical Catalan separatist
 Pedro Franco Badía (1935–2016), Secretary of Interior and Police of the Dominican Republic
 Pedro Llosas Badía (1870–1955), Spanish politician
 Rosa Badia (born 1966), Spanish computer scientist
 Tommaso Badia (1483–1547), Italian cardinal